Puerto Rico Highway 21 (PR-21) is the main highway to get to the Medical Center and Veterans Hospital in San Juan, Puerto Rico. It begins in PR-19 in Guaynabo to San Juan before ending in PR-1.

History

PR-6 was previously numbered as PR-21. Perhaps there were plans to connect current PR-21 to current PR-6, but such plans were never realized.

Major intersections

See also

 List of highways numbered 21

References

External links
 

021
Roads in San Juan, Puerto Rico